Tháp Mười is a rural district of Đồng Tháp province in the Đồng Tháp Mười region of Vietnam. As of 2003 the district had a population of 123,123. The district covers an area of 518 km². The district capital lies at Mỹ An.

Divisions
The district is divided into one urban ward and 13 communes:

Tháp Mười (ward), Hưng Thạnh, Mỹ An, Mỹ Hoà, Trường Xuân, Thanh Mỹ, Đốc Binh Kiều, Mỹ Quý, Mỹ Đông, Tân Kiều, Phú Điền, Thạnh Lợi, Láng Biển and Thị Trấn Mỹ An.

References

Districts of Đồng Tháp province